The 2018 Florida Cup was the fourth edition of Florida Cup, a friendly association football tournament played in the United States. The competition partnered with Universal Orlando Resort for the first time. The resort hosted several events including the Florida Cup Fan Fest on January 13 and 14.

The tournament was won by Atlético Nacional on goal difference ahead of Barcelona S.C. and Rangers, with Barcelona finishing second on goals scored.

Teams

Standings

Matches

References

External links

2018
2018 in American soccer
January 2018 sports events in the United States
2018 in sports in Florida